Michèle Causse (29 July 1936 – 29 July 2010) was a French lesbian activist, translator and author.

Early life
Causse was born in the Martel region of Lot in France.<ref>BIOGRAPHIE de Michèle CAUSSE, [http://www.revue-violette-leduc.net/ 'Revue Violette Leduc]</ref>
She later taught in Tunisia, and then lived for ten years in Rome, where she studied Chinese.
After that she moved to Martinique and then to the United States before emigrating to Canada.

Theory
Canadian academic Clive Thompson has referred to Causse as a "writer of radical lesbian texts." In her works, she is critical of heterosexuality, stating that "as long as a woman wishes to please a man, she is inauthentic... She does not have the integrity, the un-corruptibility that comes with not wishing to please."
Causse was also critical of both the Women's Movement and of the concept of a homosexual movement, and stated, "I am not a feminist, I am not a homosexual, I am a radical lesbian." She believed that "the women's movement is sustained by lesbians in every country; it is a lesbian movement, profoundly lesbian." She was also critical of the influence of patriarchy on lesbians, claiming that lesbians were "phallicized" in the 1980s by the male homosexual movement.

Translations
Causse translated between the French, English and Italian languages and was fluent in all three languages. Her translations of works included texts by Herman Melville, Gertrude Stein, Ti-Grace Atkinson, Djuna Barnes, Jane Bowles, Willa Cather, Mary Daly, Ignazio Silone and Alice Munro.

Last years and death

In her last years, she lived in the southwest of France. Causse chose to end her life on her 74th birthday, in association with Dignitas, an assisted suicide group in Switzerland.http://michele-causse.com/
Although Causse had no terminal illness, she had several severe diseases.
Her euthanasia was filmed and then shown on Swiss TV.

BibliographyDé/figures du soi, (unpublished)Hors de soi in ...Disent-ils, Ed. Ahla/Bagdam, Montréal / Toulouse, 2006Concept d'amour né de l'écriture de, Bagdam Espace Lesbien, Toulouse, 2006Contre le sexage, le bréviaire des Gorgones, Ed. Balland, Paris, 2000Court of appeal, récit en anglais, Revue Tessera, Montréal, 1996, in Anthologie Orlanda Frauenverlag, Berlin, 1997Quelle lesbienne êtes-vous ?, Paroles de lesbiennes, Archives Recherches Cultures Lesbiennes ARCL, Paris, 1996, 72 p.Duelle, Revue Treize, Montréal, 1994Voyages de la grande naine en Androssie, Ed. Trois, Laval, Québec, 1993L’Interloquée-Les Oubliées de l’oubli-Dé/générée, Ed. Trois, Laval, Québec, 1991The world as will and representation in Lesbian Philosophies and cultures, Ed. Jeffner Allen, 1990, pages 259–274L'ilote, Revue Trois, Montréal, 1990A quelle heure est la levée dans le désert ?, Ed. Trois, Laval, Québec, 1990(          ), (prononcer Parenthèses), Collection Topaze, Ed. Trois, Laval, 1987, 148 p.Le monde comme volonté et représentation in Emergence d'une culture au féminin, Ed. St Martin, Montréal, 1986Lettres à Omphale, Ed. Denoël-Gonthier, Paris, 1984Rencontre avec Djuna Barnes in L'almanach des dames, Ed. Flammarion, Paris, 1982, Amsterdam, 1983, pages 139–160Berthe ou un demi-siècle auprès de l'Amazone, Ed. Tierce, Paris, 1982L'intruse, poésie, Ed. du Nouveau Commerce, Paris, 1980Petite réflexion sur Bartleby, Ed. du Nouveau Commerce, Paris, 1980Lesbiana. Seven Portraits, Ed. du Nouveau Commerce, Paris, 1980Dire du corps, corps du dire in Journal d'une femme soumise de Mara, Ed. Flammarion, Paris, 1979, Amsterdam, 1981Ecrits Voix d'Italie, Ed. des Femmes, Paris, 1977L’encontre, Ed. des Femmes, Paris, 1975

MultimediaLa narrée navrée, lecture, Centenaire de Violette Leduc, video, Arras, 2007Une écrivain en terres occupées, film de Michel Garcia-Luna, DVD 47mn20, Ed. Lunaprod, 2005Corps de paroles, film of Suzanne Vertue and Dianne Heffernan, 37mn, Video-elles, Montreal, 1989A la lettre, cassette, Ed. Anne-Marie Alonzo, Montréal

ArticlesNomen est omen, post-face in "Défigures du soi", (inédit)Claude Cahun ou la mutante héroïque, Pour une anthologie des créatrices lesbiennes dans la Résistance, a cura di Paola Guazzo, Bagdam Espace Lesbien, avril 2008La narrée navrée, Centenaire de Violette Leduc, Revue Trésors à prendre, dir. Elisabeth Seys, 2007Inside Deep throat, commentary on the film Deep Throat, in collaboration with Katy Barasc, Sysiphe, 2006Pourquoi les gays ne peuvent-ils pas être les alliés objectifs des lesbiennes ?, Les Pénélopes, 2002, Bagdam Espace Lesbien, 2006Noir dessein (lettre à Nicolas Hulot), Bagdam Espace Lesbien, 2006Le genre comme espace de contention, Université de Beyrouth, 2005A propos de Lynndie England : Tragédie de la mimesis ou comment muer l'objet en sujet répréhensible, in collaboration with Katy Barasc, Sysiphe, 2004Qui a peur de Valerie Solanas ?, Bagdam Espace Edition, Toulouse, 2004, pages 19–35Hommage à Monique Wittig, Tribute to Monique Wittig. Extrait du chapitre "La grande Pérégrine" in Voyages de la Grande Naine en Androssie (Ed. Trois, Montréal, 1993), numéro spécial, Labrys-études féministes, Brasilia-Montréal-Paris, septembre 2003Sur le voile, Sisyphe, 2003Une politique textuelle inédite : l'alphalecte in Lesbianisme et féminisme. Histoires politiques, Ed. L'harmattan, 2002L'universite : Alma mater ou père indigne ?'', 2e Colloque international d'études lesbiennes: La grande dissidence et le grand effroi, Actes du colloque Espace lesbien n° 2, Bagdam Espace Edition, Toulouse, 2001

References

External links
Michèle Causse own website

French non-fiction writers
French LGBT rights activists
Lesbian feminists
French lesbian writers
Radical feminists
1936 births
2010 suicides
Filmed suicides
20th-century French translators
20th-century French women writers
Deaths by euthanasia
2010 deaths
Suicides in Switzerland